J.D. Farrell was a sternwheel steamer that operated on the Kootenay River in western Montana and southeastern British Columbia from 1898 to 1902.

Design and Construction
J.D. Farrell was designed and built by Captain M.L. McCormack, who had commanded steamboats on the Mississippi, St. Croix and Red rivers. He formed the Kootenay River Navigation Company to build and operate the vessel, which he named after J.D. Farrell, a wealthy mining backer from Spokane, Washington. Farrell was equipped with electric lights and bathrooms, then considered innovations in river transport in the region.  In contrast to some of the other vessels built in the region, Farrell was competently designed and constructed by skilled shipbuilders brought out from Stillwater, Minnesota.

Operations
J.D. Farrell was launched in November 1897 at Jennings, Montana.  At that time the only competitor on this route was the Upper Columbia Navigation & Tramway Company, under Capt.  Frank P. Armstrong.  Construction of Farrell prompted Armstrong to hire veteran shipwright Louis Pacquet from Portland, Oregon to build a comparable vessel, the sternwheeler North Star.

Captain M.L. McCormack commanded Farrell on the vessel's first trip up the Kootenay River to Fort Steele, BC. Farrell worked on the route from Jennings to Fort Steele during 1898. During 1898, Captain Armstrong and Captain McCormack combined their efforts on the upper Kootenay, with the Armstrong boats North Star  and Gwendoline receiving 60% of the freight receipts, with the balance to McCormack's single boat Farrell. James D. Miller (1830–1914), one of the Northwest's most experienced steamboat captains, commanded Farrell during this time.

On June 4, 1898, with Captain McCormack in command on the seventh trip, Farrell was wrecked in Jennings Canyon when hurricane-force winds blew the vessel off course into a rock. Farrell sank with only her bow and capstan showing above the water.  While Farrell was later raised and repaired, and repaired, business declined sharply on the route as traffic shifted over to newly completed railways, causing Farrell to be laid up at Jennings from 1899 to 1901. In 1901 A. Guthrie & Co. bought Farrell for $6,000 to use in construction of the Great Northern Railway to Fernie, BC. In the fall of 1901, the railway construction was complete, and Farrell was laid up again.

Fate
In 1903 Farrell was dismantled. The machinery, fittings and much of the upper works were taken by train to Newport, Washington to become part of the sternwheeler Spokane.

Notes

Further reading
 Faber, Jim, Steamer's Wake—Voyaging down the old marine highways of Puget Sound, British Columbia, and the Columbia River, Enetai Press, Seattle, WA 1985 
 Timmen, Fritz, Blow for the Landing, 75–78, 134, Caxton Printers, Caldwell, ID 1972

External links
 Columbia Basin Institute of Regional History
 Fort Steele Heritage Town

Steamboats of the Kootenay River
Paddle steamers of British Columbia
Regional District of East Kootenay
1897 ships
Transportation in Lincoln County, Montana